Mymonaviridae is a family of negative-strand RNA viruses in the order Mononegavirales, which infect fungi. Fungi serve as natural hosts. The name is a portmanteau of Ancient Greek myco, which means fungus, and  mononegavirales. This family was established to accommodate Sclerotinia sclerotiorum negative-stranded RNA virus 1 (SsNSRV-1) a novel virus discovered in a hypovirulent strain of Sclerotinia sclerotiorum.

Taxonomy
The following genera are recognized:

Auricularimonavirus
Botrytimonavirus
Hubramonavirus
Lentimonavirus
Penicillimonavirus
Phyllomonavirus
Plasmopamonavirus
Rhizomonavirus
Sclerotimonavirus

References

External links
 ICTV Report: Mymonaviridae

Mononegavirales
Virus families